Royal Purple is an American manufacturer which produces lubricants for automotive, industrial, marine, and racing use. It is known primarily for its line of synthetic Royal Purple Motor Oil products used in gasoline and diesel engines. They also produce other fluids including gear oil, transmission fluid, power steering fluid and industrial gear, bearing, engine, and hydraulic oil. Other products include chassis and bearing grease, lubricant aerosol, aerosol chain lubricant, and firearm lubricant.

History 
The company was founded in 1986 by John Williams, a synthetic oil developer and later consultant. Due to a customer who said he had never seen purple oil, Williams named the product Royal Purple. Producing synthetic oil using its own additives, the company grew and in 2004 completed a 125,000 square foot production facility in Porter, Texas. That same year they acquired a US federal trademark for the exclusive use of purple containers for lubricants. In 2011 Royal Purple had an annual income of 109.5 million dollars, and in 2012 was sold in over 25,000 outlets worldwide. In July 2012 Royal purple got a new owner when it was sold for 335 million dollars to Calumet Lubricants and is now part of their Branded Products Division.

Media 
In 2010 Royal Purple cooperated with DJ Funkmaster Flex to promote its products. Royal Purple announced on September 25, 2013 that it would sponsor the Las Vegas Bowl for three years, from 2013 to 2016. The deal is worth more than one million dollars a year. Royal Purple is the official lubricant for Lingenfelter Performance Engineering. And has partnered with many other organizations such as GRC and Rally Cross.

References

External links
 
 Western Canadian industrial lubricant distributor

Motor oils
Chemical companies of the United States
American companies established in 1986
Chemical companies established in 1986
Companies based in Texas